This is a list of airlines which have a current Air Operator's Certificate issued by the Hong Kong Director-General of Civil Aviation (Traditional ), and for which oversight as recognised by the ICAO lies with the Civil Aviation Department. For airlines of Mainland China and Macau, click List of airlines of China, List of airlines of Macau.

Scheduled airlines

Charter airlines

Cross-border Helicopter Service

Cargo airlines

See also
List of defunct airlines of Hong Kong
List of airports in Hong Kong
List of defunct airlines of Asia
List of airlines of China
List of airlines of Macau

References

Airlines
Airlines
Hong Kong
Hong Kong